Garrett Robin Hamler, known professionally as Sean Garrett, is an American songwriter and record producer. He is responsible for a series of chart-topping compositions, most notably Usher's "Yeah!" which ranks second on the Billboard Hot 100 Songs of the Decade for 2000–2009, and other songs written by him which include Ciara's breakout track "Goodies", Teairra Marí's debut single "Make Her Feel Good", Mario's single "Break Up", Nicki Minaj's first single "Massive Attack", and The Pussycat Dolls' single "Buttons".

Garrett has produced eighteen number-one singles in seven years of producing music, putting him in fifth place on the Billboard list of producers with the most number-one hits. Garrett is the first producer to achieve this measure of success in under a decade since George Martin, who produced 20 number-one hits for The Beatles in  years from 1964 to 1970. He is also the only active hip hop producer that is mentioned on the Billboard list of producers with the most number-one hits.

Garrett is in a production duo with Swizz Beatz, and together they produced several Beyoncé singles: "Ring the Alarm", "Get Me Bodied", "Upgrade U", "Check on It", "Diva", and "Video Phone". He also writes often over productions by Polow da Don and has been nominated for four Grammy Awards.

Early life 
Born in Atlanta, Georgia, he moved with his family to Europe when he was four. His father was in the U.S. military and they never stayed long in one place. He transferred between army bases across Germany and England.  He performed in talent shows that led to a recording contract with Ariola or BMG when he was 17. A few years later when he returned to the U.S. and began writing and recording songs.  Garrett insisted he was an artist, not a songwriter but went back to school, graduated from college with an A.A. degree in business from the University of Maryland's program in Germany. He then took a job as a mortgage broker in South Carolina.

Career 
Garrett embarked on a career as a performer. His debut album, Turbo 919, was released June 21, 2008, on his Bet I Penned It Music imprint, through Interscope Records. Garrett's catchphrase, which is featured in multiple songs he has produced, is "Smash on the radio, bet I penned it".

Ludacris appeared on Garrett's debut single, "Grippin'". In return, Garrett was featured on Ludacris's "What Them Girls Like", alongside Chris Brown. He also wrote and produced a song called "I Did It for Love" for South Korean pop singer BoA for her first eponymous English album. Garrett is featured and appears in the music video. In March 2010, Garrett released the first single from his mixtape The Inkwell, "Get It All", which features Nicki Minaj. The lead single for Garrett's 2011 album previously titled Courtesy Of, was released February 4, 2011, featuring J. Cole entitled "Feel Love". In April 2011 the single entitled "In da Box" featuring Rick Ross was released.

Discography

Studio albums

Mixtapes

Singles

As lead artist

As featured artist

Other charted songs

Guest appearances

Songwriting 
Usher –
 "Yeah!"
 "Papers"
Ciara – "Goodies"
Teairra Marí "Make Her Feel Good"
Mario – "Break Up"
Ludacris – "What Them Girls Like"
Nicki Minaj – 
 "Massive Attack"
 "Get It All"
Brandy –
 "Put It Down" feat. Chris Brown
 "Wildest Dreams"
Enrique Iglesias – "Away"
Kelis – "Bossy"
Trey Songz – "Does He Do It"
Nelly –
 "Party People"
 "Grillz"
The Pussycat Dolls – "Buttons"
3LW – "Ain't Enough"
Britney Spears – "Toy Soldier"
Lil Wayne – "Ice"
Miley Cyrus
"SMS (Bangerz)"
"Love Money Party"
Jesse McCartney – "How Do You Sleep"
Destiny's Child
"Lose My Breath"
"Soldier"
"Girl"
Beyoncé
 "Ring the Alarm"
 "Get Me Bodied"
 "Upgrade U"
 "Check on It"
 "Lay Up Under Me"
 "Diva"
 "Video Phone"
Kelly Rowland – "Like This"
Ricky Martin – "I Don't Care"
112
 "U Already Know"
 "If I Hit"
 "My Mistakes"
 "The Way"
 "Closing The Club"
 "Why Can't We Get Along"
Nicole Scherzinger – "Whatever U Like"
Gwen Stefani – "Now That You Got It"
Santana – "This Boy's Fire"
Joe – "Where You At"
Austin Mahone – "Banga Banga"
Jacquees – "Come Get It"

Awards and nominations 
Soul Train Music Awards
2009, Best Collaboration "Break Up" (nominated)

References

External links 
 
 
 

Living people
African-American record producers
Record producers from Georgia (U.S. state)
University of Maryland, College Park alumni
African-American male singer-songwriters
American contemporary R&B singers
21st-century African-American male singers
Singer-songwriters from Georgia (U.S. state)
Year of birth missing (living people)
People from Atlanta